Mapletown Junior/Senior High School is a public Junior/Senior High School, located near Greensboro, Pennsylvania (65 miles south of Pittsburgh) It is the sole secondary facility of the Southeastern Greene School District.

Graduation Requirements
In order to graduate from Mapletown, students must successfully complete 27 credits of coursework, successfully score Proficient or above on the Pennsylvania System of School Assessments (PSSA) during grade 11 and complete a Graduation Project during their senior year.

Credit Coursework
There are two Credit Programs at Mapletown for students in Grades 10-12:
College/Career Preparatory Program: Students take courses in order to meet minimum requirements for institutions of post-secondary learning.
Career-Technical-Center: Students in this category attend the Greene County Career and Technology Center in Franklin Township, near Waynesburg for one-half of the school day in a particular program and attend Mapletown the other half of the day.

Credit Breakdown
Students must earn Credits in the following manner in order to graduate:
 Language Arts - 4 Credits
 Mathematics - 4 Credits
 Science - 4 Credits
 Social Studies - 3 Credits
 Arts and Humanities - 1 Credit
 Physical Education - 0.5 Credit
 Health - 0.5 Credit
 Electives - 10 Credits (CTC students must earn 1 Credit in Freshman Year)

Athletics
Mapletown participates in Western Pennsylvania Interscholastic Athletic League, WPIAL for short, which is PIAA Disttict VII

Junior High Athletics
Mapletown Junior High School participates in non-sanctioned athletics  for students in grades 7 and 8:
 Basketball
 Football

References

Public high schools in Pennsylvania
Public middle schools in Pennsylvania
Schools in Greene County, Pennsylvania